WEOL (930 AM) is a commercial radio station licensed to serve Elyria, Ohio, and features a talk and sports radio format. Owned by the Elyria-Lorain Broadcasting Co., WEOL services Lorain and Medina counties and the western parts of Greater Cleveland. The station is the local affiliate for The Ramsey Show, Daliah Wachs, Jim Bohannon and Kim Komando, Fox Sports Radio and ABC News Radio, and the Cleveland Guardians, Cleveland Cavaliers, Columbus Blue Jackets, and Ohio State radio networks.

WEOL's studios are located in Elyria, and the station transmitter resides in nearby Grafton.  In addition to a standard analog transmission, WEOL simulcasts over low-power analog Elyria translator W262DM (100.3 FM), and is available online.

History
WEOL signed on October 17, 1948, at both 930 kHz and 107.3 MHz, in Elyria, Ohio with studios in the Elyria Savings and Trust Building in downtown Elyria. The FM installations, like most of the era, were established as an adjunct to the AM programming. Both stations were owned by the newly created Elyria-Lorain Broadcasting Co.  The station's early years were spent fighting for its very survival. In the 1930s and 1940s, the Lorain Journal (today known as The Morning Journal) enjoyed a monopoly in news coverage and advertising revenue in Lorain. With the establishment of WEOL, however, the Journal feared the presence of this new competitor. In response, the Journal unofficially instituted an "exclusivity policy" that prevented Journal advertisers from doing business with WEOL.  WEOL's owners sued Journal Publishing, and it went all the way to the U.S. Supreme Court. In the 1951 decision Lorain Journal Co. v. United States, 343 U.S. 143, it was found that the Journal violated key provisions of the Sherman Antitrust Act by seeking to maintain their near monopoly on advertising revenue. In addition, the Journal was found to have acted in a "predatory" and illegal manner.

On May 15, 1958, Elyria-Lorain Broadcasting Co. was purchased by the Lorain County Printing and Publishing Company, making it a wholly owned subsidiary. LCP&P also owns the Elyria Chronicle-Telegram and Medina Gazette; in effect forming a radio/newspaper duopoly. This arrangement has lasted to this day, grandfathered by FCC legislation that now prohibits such arrangements.  Through the 1950s, WEOL was a "real hot rocker," playing the early gyrating rhythms of rock 'n roll to sock hops throughout Lorain County, and as far away as Ontario, Canada. By this same time, records show that the station had obtained a construction permit in the mid-1950s for WEOL-TV on channel 31, but the television station never made it on the air.

Personalities who worked at WEOL in their early years include Alice Weston (later with WUAB-TV - and who was present at WEOL's sign-on), Dick Conrad, Gary Short (later with WERE, WDBN, WDOK, WJW-TV, WUAB-TV), Ron and Dick Barrett, Ron Penfound (better known as "Captain Penny" on WEWS-TV), Neil Zurcher (later with WJW-TV), Jim Mehrling (later with WERE and WCLV), David Mark (later with WEWS-TV, WNCR/WKSW, WQAL, and WDOK, the promotional voice of many Fox and UPN TV stations across the country, and radio image voice for radio stations around the world) and Jeff Baxter (later with WWIZ/WLRO, WDBN, WLEC, who later teamed up with Jack Riley at WERE). For over 30 years, Jim Mehrling has produced and hosted The High School Scholastic Games of Lorain County programs on WEOL with David Mark as the program announcer.  Jeff Baxter also helped make nationally popular a recording artist in Laura Lee Perkins. Laura, who recently moved to Elyria from her home state of West Virginia, broke out into a song while visiting the WEOL studios. Hearing her sing, Jeff gave her airtime on the station, and eventually parlayed it into a west-coast recording deal.

In 1968, WEOL-FM started separate programming under new calls WBEA with an automated easy-listening format that still served the Lorain County audience. The format changed in 1982 to top-40 while retaining the same call letters. Initially an independent station, WEOL affiliated with the Mutual Broadcasting System in the early 1960s, and then switched to ABC Radio's American Entertainment Network in 1968. Throughout the 1970s, '80s and '90s, WEOL was "Your Hometown Radio Station," a middle-of-the-road outlet that put a heavy emphasis on local news and sports programming. WEOL also hired the first radio newswoman in the county back in the mid-1970s with Sandy Kozel, now with Associated Press Radio.

In 1982, WEOL and WBEA moved to new studios on 538 Broad Street, where WEOL remains to this day. WEOL began broadcasting in C-QUAM AM stereo in the mid-1980s before dropping the standard in the late 1990s. On New Year's Day 1987, WBEA changed to "Z-Rock" WCZR with an automated rock format; then eleven months later, WCZR changed to smooth jazz as "The Wave" WNWV, positioned to serve the Cleveland market. WNWV was sold off in December 2011 to the Akron-based Rubber City Radio Group, and subsequently moved out of their Elyria studios.

Over the course of time, WEOL's news and sports department has garnered dozens of awards from the Ohio Associated Press and Cleveland Press Club, particularly "Outstanding News Operation" in large market radio. On November 28, 1997, WEOL dropped its MOR format for a "news all day, sports at night" approach with the Associated Press All News Radio network from 5:00 a.m. to 7:00 p.m., and One-on-One Sports (today SB Nation Radio) from 7:00 p.m. to 5:00 a.m., along with long-form local news programming in drive-time hours. WEOL was re-branded as "The News Station," taking its cue from the All News Radio positioners.  WEOL started to segue into airing topical talk programming by adding Clark Howard in the late 90s, Jim Bohannon in 2000, Sam Donaldson in 2001, and Mitch Albom's show in early 2003. In May 2005, WEOL picked up Glenn Beck in the late morning slot, one year after the cancellation of Sam Donaldson's talk show. At the beginning of 2006, WEOL replaced Mitch Albom, whose show was no longer distributed nationally, with Sean Hannity. Hannity's show was dropped from the lineup at the end of 2016, and ultimately replaced with a local news/interview program hosted by area broadcaster Andy "Bull" Barch.

On July 15, 2005, the Associated Press All News Radio network ceased operations. While this prompted WEOL to pick up Fox Sports Radio for evening and weekend programming, the station maintained use of the All News Radio "News Station" name for on-air promotions until April 2006.  On November 5, 2008, WEOL replaced Glenn Beck with Laura Ingraham as WTAM reacquired the rights to Glenn's program.

From May 31, 2005 until August 20, 2010, Les in the Morning, hosted by Les Sekely, ran in morning-drive as a mixture of news updates, comedy, contests and interviews.  Sekely left WEOL to take a full-time teaching job at Westlake High School as the advisor of the school television station. His replacement, Jeff Thomas, has been a long-time sports update anchor with Metro Networks and WKNR.  Thomas then left on August 26, 2011 to become the new morning sports anchor on WKRK-FM in Cleveland; his successors are long-time WEOL staffers Bruce Van Dyke and Craig Adams.

On October 17, 2008, WEOL marked its 60th anniversary of broadcasting.

FM translator 
Since August 2, 2019, WEOL has been rebroadcast over Elyria, Ohio FM translator W262DM (100.3 FM).

Programming
The station's lone local offering is a morning-drive show co-hosted by Bruce Van Dyke and Craig Adams. Syndicated programming includes The Ramsey Show, Dr. Daliah and Jim Bohannon on weekdays, and Danny Lipford and Kim Komando on weekends. Fox Sports Radio programming is also extensively featured. WEOL serves as the Lorain and Medina County affiliate for the Cleveland Guardians, the Cleveland Cavaliers, Ohio State Buckeyes football and basketball and the Columbus Blue Jackets; additionally, WEOL airs various local high school sporting contests.

References

External links

FM translator

1948 establishments in Ohio
News and talk radio stations in the United States
Radio stations established in 1948
EOL